A breakup is the termination of a usually intimate relationship by any means other than death.

Break Up may also refer to:

Nature 

 Breakup, the time of year when ice and snow melt

Mechanical properties
 In aviation and spaceflight, a complete destruction or fragmentation of a moving vehicle as a result of mechanical malfunction, aerodynamic stress or other, such as in the Challenger and Columbia space shuttle disasters, or TWA Flight 800.

Film
 Break Up (1965 film), also known as The Man with the Balloons, an Italian film directed by Marco Ferreri
 Ceremony of Disbanding, a 1967 Japanese yakuza film also known as The Breakup
 Break Up (1978 film), starring Tony Musante and Ornella Muti
 Break Up (1998 film), starring Bridget Fonda, Kiefer Sutherland, and Steven Weber
 The Break-Up, a 2006 film starring Vince Vaughn and Jennifer Aniston
 The BreakUp, a 2021 American short film directed by Julie Deffet and Nick von Gremp

Television
 Break Up (TV program), starring Bernadette Peters and Carl Ballantine
 "The Break Up" (Glee), a television episode
 "The Break-Up" (Recess), a television episode

Music
 Break Up (album), by Pete Yorn and Scarlett Johansson
 Break Up, an EP by the Smoking Popes
 "Break Up" (song), by Mario
"Break Up", a 1965 single by Del Shannon
"Break Up", a 1972 song by The Nashville Teens
 Break Up, a 2022 song by girl group Citizen Queen (2022)
"Break Up", a 2009 song by Lil Wayne
"Break Ups", a 2012 song by Reks from Straight, No Chaser

See also
 Breaking Up (disambiguation)
 Ship breaking, the scrapping of old ships